Peqin is a town and municipality in Elbasan County, central Albania. The municipality was formed at the 2015 local government reform by the merger of the former municipalities Gjoçaj, Karinë, Pajovë, Peqin, Përparim and Shezë, that became municipal units. The seat of the municipality is the town Peqin. The total population is 26,136 (2011 census), in a total area of 197.90 km2. The population of the former municipality at the 2011 census was 6,353.

History

The city dates back 2000 years, it is mentioned as Illyrian fortress. The ancient name of Peqin was Clodiana. The city's modern name derives from the Ottoman form Bekleyin, which means a place of hospitality. During Ottoman rule Peqin belonged to the Sanjak of Elbasan. The Ottoman Peqin Castle still exists, along with some original parts of the mosque of Abdurrahman Pasha, who had been the governor of Wallachia and Moldavia (former Bogdania). This castle was also constructed during the Via Egnatia road being made. On the Via Egnatia road Peqin was another stop on the road and a settlement for soldiers and there were Pashas in the castle. The last remaining resident in the castle was Demir Pasha.

Historic places
Peqin Castle
Via Egnatia
Orthodox church
Protestant church
Moschue of Peqin

Transport

Bus
There are buses available at the center of the city which run to many places in and out of Albania.

Train
There is a train station in the city and trains pass by on the Durrës-Pogradec line.

Highway
There is the SH7 stateroad on the outer city ring of Peqin and starts in Rrogozhinë and ends in Bradashesh, Elbasan.

Sports

The football team of Peqin is KS Shkumbini. The team was founded in 1951 and its home ground is Shkumbini Stadium with a capacity of 9,000 spectators. KS Shkumbini currently plays in the Albanian Second Division. KS Shkumbini is famous for its fans, called Besnikët, known as Faithful.

Notable people 
 Mustafa Gjinishi, activist during National Liberation War
 Hekuran Isai, post-World War II communist politician
 Gugash Magani, football player and manager
 Murat Manahasa, veterinary researcher and professor
 Abdurrahman Pasha, former governor of Wallachia and Moldavia within Ottoman Empire

See also 
 Clock Mosque

References 

 
Municipalities in Elbasan County
Administrative units of Peqin
Towns in Albania